Lina Sjöberg (born 6 September 1993) is a Swedish trampoline gymnast. She is a three-time gold medalist in the women's double mini trampoline event at the Trampoline Gymnastics World Championships. She also won the gold medal in this event at the 2016 European Trampoline Championships held in Valladolid, Spain.

Career 

In 2017, she won the bronze medal in the women's double mini event at the World Games held in Wrocław, Poland.

At the 2018 European Trampoline Championships held in Baku, Azerbaijan, she won the bronze medal in the women's double mini event.

In 2019, she represented Sweden at the European Games in the women's trampoline event. She did not qualify to compete in the final.

She won the bronze medal in the women's double mini event at the 2022 World Games held in Birmingham, United States.

References 

Living people
1993 births
Sportspeople from Uppsala
Swedish female trampolinists
Medalists at the Trampoline Gymnastics World Championships
Gymnasts at the 2019 European Games
European Games competitors for Sweden
Competitors at the 2017 World Games
Competitors at the 2022 World Games
World Games bronze medalists
21st-century Swedish women